William Wightman Beveridge (27 November 1858 – 26 January 1941) was a Scottish footballer and track and field athlete.

A Scottish athletics sprint champion born in Cumnock, Ayrshire, and educated at Ayr Academy, Beveridge was capped three times by the Scotland national football team between 1879 and 1880 while studying at the University of Glasgow and playing for Glasgow University F.C. He scored one international goal – against Wales in March 1880. He later moved to the University of Edinburgh to study divinity.

In 1883 he became the Reverend Beveridge and was ordained as a Church of Scotland minister. He lived and worked in Port Glasgow until his retirement in 1927. Beveridge was an ardent supporter of the Temperance movement in Scotland and published a pamphlet, 'The athlete and alcohol: a message to young men', now held in New College Library (Special Collections) Edinburgh University.

References

External links

International stats

1858 births
1941 deaths
People from Cumnock
Scottish footballers
Scotland international footballers
Scottish male sprinters
British male sprinters
Association football outside forwards
Footballers from East Ayrshire
19th-century Ministers of the Church of Scotland
Alumni of the University of Glasgow
Alumni of the University of Edinburgh
People educated at Ayr Academy
Glasgow University F.C. players
20th-century Ministers of the Church of Scotland